3-Methylcatechol is a chemical compound, a methylbenzenediol.

Metabolism 
The enzyme 1,2-dihydroxy-6-methylcyclohexa-3,5-dienecarboxylate dehydrogenase uses 1,2-dihydroxy-6-methylcyclohexa-3,5-dienecarboxylate and NAD+ to produce 3-methylcatechol, NADH and CO2.

The isofunctional enzymes of catechol 1,2-dioxygenase from species of Acinetobacter, Pseudomonas, Nocardia, Alcaligenes and Corynebacterium oxidize 3-methylcatechol according to both the intradiol and extradiol cleavage patterns. However, the enzyme preparations from Brevibacterium and Arthrobacter have only the intradiol cleavage activity.

Related compounds 
The 3-methylcatechol structural motif is rare in natural products. Known examples include calopin and a δ-lactone derivative, O-acetylcyclocalopin A, which have been isolated from the fungus Caloboletus calopus.

References

External links 
 phenol-explorer.eu

Catechols